Myrmecocystus testaceus is a species of ant. Found throughout southern United States, this species of ant is usually nocturnal, and nests in sand.

They can spray formic acid out of their gaster to melt skin tissue. instead of stinging and swarming, they normally stretch out the prey by the legs until it splits or dies from bites and formic acid.

References

Formicinae
Hymenoptera of North America
Insects described in 1893